The government of Gordon Bajnai was the government of Hungary between 14 April 2009 and 29 May 2010. Gordon Bajnai formed a minority government after the resignation of Ferenc Gyurcsány. The cabinet was supported externally by the parliamentary group of the Alliance of Free Democrats (SZDSZ).

Coalition members:  and

References 

Hungarian governments
2009 establishments in Hungary
2010 disestablishments in Hungary
Cabinets established in 2009
Cabinets disestablished in 2010